Jared Forrest Golden (born July 25, 1982) is an American politician and a Marine Corps veteran serving as the U.S. representative for Maine's 2nd congressional district since 2019. A member of the Democratic Party, his district, the largest east of the Mississippi River by area, covers the northern four-fifths of the state, including Lewiston, Bangor, and Auburn. Golden, along with Angus King and Chellie Pingree, are the first members of Congress to be elected by ranked-choice voting. Golden is the only member of Congress elected after finishing second in the first round of tabulation. He was deployed to Iraq and Afghanistan as a United States Marine.

Early life and education
Golden was born in Lewiston and raised in Leeds. He attended Leavitt Area High School. Golden enrolled as a student at the University of Maine at Farmington but left after one year to join the United States Marine Corps in 2002. He served combat tours in Iraq and Afghanistan.

After returning home to Maine, Golden attended Bates College, graduating with a degree in history and politics. He went on to work for an international logistics firm and then for Maine's Republican Senator Susan Collins on the Homeland Security and Governmental Affairs Committee.

Maine House of Representatives
Golden returned to Maine in 2013 to work for the House Democratic Office in the Maine Legislature. As a Democrat, Golden ran for and was elected to the Maine House of Representatives in 2014, representing part of the city of Lewiston. He was reelected in 2016. In the subsequent legislative session, Golden became Assistant House Majority Leader. Golden chaired the Elections Committee and the Joint Select Committee on Joint Rules.

U.S. House of Representatives

Elections

2018 

On June 20, 2018, he was declared the winner of the Democratic primary, defeating environmentalist Lucas St. Clair and bookstore owner Craig Olson.

On election night, Golden trailed Poliquin by 2,000 votes. As neither candidate won a majority, Maine's newly implemented ranked-choice voting system called for the votes of independents Tiffany Bond and William Hoar to be redistributed to Poliquin or Golden in accordance with their voters' second choice. The independents' supporters ranked Golden as their second choice by an overwhelming margin, allowing him to defeat Poliquin by 3,000 votes after the final tabulation. He is the first challenger to unseat an incumbent in the district since 1916.

Poliquin opposed the use of ranked-choice voting in the election and claimed to be the winner due to his first-round lead. He filed a lawsuit in federal court to have ranked-choice voting declared unconstitutional and be declared the winner. Judge Lance E. Walker rejected all of Poliquin's arguments and upheld the certified results. Poliquin appealed to the U.S. Court of Appeals for the First Circuit and requested an order to prevent Golden from being certified as the winner, but the request was rejected. On December 24, Poliquin dropped his lawsuit, allowing Golden to take the seat.

2020 

Golden ran for reelection in 2020 and won the Democratic primary unopposed. His Republican opponent was Dale Crafts, a former Maine Representative. Most political pundits expected Golden to win the general election easily; polling showed him ahead of Crafts by an average of about 19%, Sabato's Crystal Ball and The Cook Political Report both rating the contest as "Likely Democratic", and analysis website FiveThirtyEight predicted that Golden had a 96 out of 100 chance of winning, with Golden garnering nearly 57% of the vote in their projection of the most likely scenario.

In November, Golden defeated Crafts 53%–47%, a closer margin than expected. President Donald Trump carried the district in that same election.

2022 

Golden ran for reelection in 2022 and won the Democratic primary unopposed. He faced former Republican congressman Bruce Poliquin, whom he narrowly beat in 2018, and independent Tiffany Bond, who also ran for the 2nd congressional district seat in 2018. In July, Golden was endorsed by the Fraternal Order of Police, Maine's largest police union, which "split the ticket" by also endorsing former Republican governor Paul LePage. Polls again showed Golden with a lead, but many organizations rated the seat as a "tossup", as incumbent President Joe Biden was unpopular and inflation was approaching 40-year highs; Decision Desk HQ even gave the seat a "Leans Republican" rating. Nonetheless, Golden led the field in the first round, and defeated Poliquin 53%–47% after Bond's second-choice votes mostly flowed to him.

Tenure
Golden was sworn in on January 3, 2019. During the election for Speaker of the House, he voted against Democratic Caucus nominee Nancy Pelosi, as he had pledged to do during his campaign, instead voting for Representative Cheri Bustos of Illinois. On December 18, 2019, Golden voted for Article I of the articles of impeachment against Donald Trump but was one of three Democrats to vote against Article II.

On February 6, 2020, Golden endorsed Senator Michael Bennet of Colorado for president during the 2020 Democratic Party presidential primaries.

As of August 2022, Golden had voted in line with Joe Biden's stated position 85.7% of the time, the lowest rate of any member of the Democratic caucus.

Build Back Better Act
Golden was the lone House Democrat to vote against the Build Back Better Act, citing concerns about the elimination of the $10,000 cap on the SALT deduction and the lack of prescription drug pricing reform. He later joined all other Democrats in voting for the Inflation Reduction Act of 2022, an amended version of the original bill.

Criminal justice reform
On March 2, 2021, Golden was one of 97 Democrats to vote for an amendment to create a federal mandate that states allow convicted felons to vote while serving their prison sentences.

The next day, Golden was one of two Democrats to vote against the George Floyd Justice in Policing Act. In a statement after the vote, Golden said the bill "includes many good provisions that would bring about positive change", mentioning the establishment of a national registry for police misconduct, increased data collection, encouragement of deescalation tactics, and banning chokeholds unless deadly force is authorized. But he expressed concern about the provision that would restrict qualified immunity and lamented that there had "been no negotiations since the legislation's first passage, and the bill before us retains those same problematic changes".

Foreign policy
During the Russo-Ukrainian War, Golden organized a letter, signed by himself and other members of Congress, advocating for President Biden to give F-16 fighter jets to Ukraine.

Guns
Golden was the only Democrat to vote against the Bipartisan Background Checks Act to expand background checks on gun purchases and one of two Democrats, along with Ron Kind of Wisconsin, to vote against the Enhanced Background Checks Act of 2021, designed to close the so-called Charleston loophole. Both bills passed the House in March 2021.

In 2022, Golden was one of two Democrats, the other being Kurt Schrader of Oregon, to vote against raising the minimum age to purchase semi-automatic rifles from 18 to 21.

On July 29, 2022, Golden and four other Democrats joined the Republicans in voting against a bill banning assault weapons.

COVID-19 policy
On January 31, 2023, Golden was among seven Democrats to vote for H.R.497:Freedom for Health Care Workers Act, a bill which would lift COVID-19 vaccine mandates for healthcare workers.

On February 1, 2023, Golden was among twelve Democrats to vote for a resolution to end COVID-19 national emergency.

Marijuana policy
Golden has an "A" rating from NORML for his voting record on cannabis-related matters.

Stimulus
Golden was one of two House Democrats to vote against the first version of the American Rescue Plan Act of 2021, a stimulus bill intended to address the ongoing COVID-19 pandemic and the resultant economic fallout. He cited concerns such as broad eligibility for $1,400 stimulus checks and high levels of public debt, saying, "At some point, the bill has to come due."

Trade
Golden was one of 38 Democrats to vote against the United States–Mexico–Canada Agreement Implementation Act. Explaining his vote, he said the law's labeling requirements would not be enough to keep international companies from misbranding products, putting Maine's businesses at a disadvantage. He said he was skeptical it would be enforced sufficiently to protect workers, saying "we have a bad track record" in doing so with other trade deals.

Committee assignments
 Committee on Armed Services
 Subcommittee on Seapower and Projection Forces
 Subcommittee on Tactical Air and Land Forces
 Committee on Small Business
 Subcommittee on Contracting and Workforce (Chair)

Caucus memberships
Blue Dog Coalition
For Country Caucus (co-chair)
Problem Solvers Caucus

Electoral history

% (gross) = percent of all valid votes cast (without eliminating the exhausted votes)

% (net) = percent of votes cast after eliminating the exhausted votes

% (gross) = percent of all valid votes cast (without eliminating the exhausted votes)

% (net) = percent of votes cast after eliminating the exhausted votes

% (gross) = percent of all valid votes cast (without eliminating the exhausted votes)

% (net) = percent of votes cast after eliminating the exhausted votes

Personal life
Golden's wife Isobel (née Moiles) served as a city councilor in Lewiston from 2016 to 2018. They have a daughter, who was born in May 2021.

References

External links

 Congressman Jared Golden official U.S. House website
Jared Golden for Congress campaign website

 

|-

|-

|-

1982 births
21st-century American politicians
United States Marine Corps personnel of the Iraq War
United States Marine Corps personnel of the War in Afghanistan (2001–2021)
Bates College alumni
Democratic Party members of the United States House of Representatives from Maine
Living people
Democratic Party members of the Maine House of Representatives
People from Leeds, Maine
Politicians from Lewiston, Maine